Skawinka Skawina (TKS Skawinka Skawina) is a Polish football club based in Skawina. They currently play in the Polish regional league, the sixth tier of the Polish football league.

History 

The beginnings of the club dates back to 1918, when two Kraków students, Madej Stanisław and Lisowski Franciszek, tried to train football in the city of Skawina. Due to numerous failures, the issue of establishing the club was suspended for several years. It was only at the beginning of 1921 that a few football enthusiasts wanted to change this state of affairs. It was then that a clubhouse and a sports field were arranged. A request was also submitted to the KOZPN to accept the team as a member, and the club was officially founded 1922 by obtaining the membership. On May 10, 1925, the Skawinka ground was opened.

Squad 

Trener:

Current coaching staff

Sources:

References

External links 
 

Football clubs in Poland
Association football clubs established in 1922
1922 establishments in Poland